The Kazakhstan Curling Cup WCT Mixed Doubles is an annual mixed doubles curling tournament on the ISS Mixed Doubles World Curling Tour. It is held in Almaty, Kazakhstan

The purse for the event is $8,000 (US). 

It has been part of the World Curling Tour since 2022, and has been held twice since joining the tour, in May and July 2022. 

The May 2022 event featured teams from across Central Asia; hosts Kazakhstan, India, Afghanistan, Kyrgyzstan, and Uzbekistan, as well as South Korea. An Indian curler, P. N. Raju was a member of the runner up pair, becoming the first Indian to earn a podium finish at a WCT event.

Past champions

References

World Curling Tour events
Curling competitions in Kazakhstan
Sports competitions in Almaty
Mixed doubles curling